Somewhere Deep in the Night is the seventh studio album by the British pop group Swing Out Sister. Produced by longtime collaborator Paul Staveley O'Duffy, the album was first released in Japan in 2001, with a European and American release the following year.

Composition
Since the group's second album, 1989's Kaleidoscope World, the group has consisted of Corinne Drewery on lead vocals and multi-instrumentalist Andy Connell. On this album, Connell provides keyboards, synthesizer, guitar and accordion. Other contributing musicians on the album include Tim Cansfield (guitar), Nigel Hitchcock (tenor saxophone), Noel Langley (trumpet and fluegelhorn), and Jody Linscott (percussion). In addition to Connell, other backing vocalists include Beverley Skeete, Dee Lewis, Gina Foster and Stephanie de Sykes.

The track Alpine Crossing is a reinterpretation of the 1972 track Hot Heels by Barbara Moore and De Wolfe Music.

Critical reception
AllMusic gave Somewhere Deep in the Night four stars out of a possible five, stating that the album "is a very strong album from the duo, packed full of sweeping, melancholy tunes". Reviewer Nick Dedina continues by describing how the album "...uses its sumptuous, melodramatic arrangements to sugar rather bleak songs of confusion and lost love...rather than simply dazzle the listener with retro-schmaltz."

Track listing
"Through the Sky" - 3:55  (Andy Connell/Corinne Drewery/Paul Staveley O'Duffy) 
"Will We Find Love?" - 3:55  (A. Connell/C. Drewery/P. S. O'Duffy) 
"Somewhere Deep in the Night" - 4:29 (A. Connell/C. Drewery/P. S. O'Duffy) 
"The Vital Thing" - 2:48  (A. Connell/C. Drewery/P. S. O'Duffy/Nigel Hitchcock) 
"What Kind of Fool Are You?" - 4:04  (A. Connell/C. Drewery/P. S. O'Duffy) 
"Suspended in Time" - 1:39  (A. Connell/C. Drewery/P. S. O'Duffy) 
"Alpine Crossing" - 3:07  (A. Connell/C. Drewery/P. S. O'Duffy) 
"Fool Tag" - 0:27  (A. Connell/C. Drewery/P. S. O'Duffy) 
"Where the Hell Did I Go Wrong?" - 4:10  (A. Connell/C. Drewery/P. S. O'Duffy) 
"Non E Vero Ma Ci Credo" - 4:08  (A. Connell/C. Drewery/P. S. O'Duffy) 
"Touch Me Now" - 3:56  (A. Connell/C. Drewery/P. S. O'Duffy) 
"The Vital Thing - Take B" - 2:27  (A. Connell/C. Drewery/P. S. O'Duffy/N. Hitchcock) 
"Where Do I Go?" - 4:23  (A. Connell/C. Drewery/P. S. O'Duffy) 
"Now Listen to Me" - 3:30  (A. Connell/C. Drewery/P. S. O'Duffy)

Personnel 
Swing Out Sister
 Andy Connell – acoustic piano, keyboards, synthesizers, accordion, guitars, Fender bass, vibraphone, backing vocals, vocal ensemble (3)
 Corinne Drewery – lead vocals, vocal ensemble (3)

Additional Musicians
 Tim Cansfield – guitar (1, 2, 3, 7), backing vocals, vocal ensemble (3)
 Matt Becker – guitar (5)
 Anton Drewery – guitar (13)
 Paul Staveley O'Duffy – computer and rhythm programming, backing vocals, vocal ensemble (3)
 Jody Linscott – percussion, vocal ensemble (3)
 Nigel Hitchcock – tenor saxophone
 Noel Langley – trumpet, flugelhorn 
 Stephanie de Sykes – backing vocals 
 Gina Foster – backing vocals 
 Dee Lewis – backing vocals 
 Beverley Skeete – backing vocals
 Kaysi Foster – vocal ensemble (3)
 Coco Linscott – vocal ensemble (3)
 Kachina Linscott-Dechert – vocal ensemble (3)
 Ayu Sekioka – vocal ensemble (3)
 Myke Wilson – scat (3)
 Yasmin Sarkic – voice (4)
 Gersende Giorgio – voice (6)

Production 
 Paul Staveley O'Duffy – producer, engineer
 James Martin – photography 
 Swing Out Sister – design
 The Red Room – design

References

2001 albums
Swing Out Sister albums